Blackwater Creek may refer to various riverine features including:
in Australia
Blackwater Creek (New South Wales)
in the United States of America
Blackwater Creek (Lake County, Florida)
Blackwater Creek (Hillsborough County, Florida)